The Presidential Council was an advisory body in Turkey lasting from 1983 to 1989. It comprised the military commanders who joined General Kenan Evren in the 1980 coup d'état. It succeeded the National Security Council (1980–1983), of which Evren had been President, which was formally abolished after the 1983 general election, and reconstituted as the Presidential Council. Evren remained President of Turkey until 1989.

Membership (in 1985)

References

Sources
The Europa World Year Book 1985, Volume I, p. 889

See also 
1980 Turkish coup d'état
Kenan Evren

Military of Turkey
Politics of Turkey
Turkish governmental institutions